Live At Gotham Hall, is a live promotional presentation, available on DVD, of the concert of Il Divo in the Gotham Hall of New York, of December 2004.

It was the first concert of Il Divo, and the first DVD.

Smart of songs 
It contains a concert with five songs in direct;

Personal

Voice 
 Urs Bühler
 Sébastien Izambard
 Carlos Marín
 David Miller

References

See also 
 Il Divo discography
 Il Divo videography

2004 video albums
Il Divo albums